Galepsus or Galepsos may refer to:
Galepsus (Chalcidice), a town of Chalcidice, ancient Macedonia
Galepsus (Thrace), a town of ancient Thrace